Yasvani Yusri (born 10 February 1998) is an Indonesian professional footballer who plays as a right-back for Liga 2 club PSDS Deli Serdang.

Club career

Persiraja Banda Aceh
He was signed for Persiraja Banda Aceh to play in the Liga 1 in the 2021 season. Yasvani made his league debut on 7 January 2022 in a match against PSS Sleman at the Ngurah Rai Stadium, Denpasar.

Career statistics

References

External links
 Yasvani Yusri at Soccerway
 Yasvani Yusri at Liga Indonesia

1998 births
Living people
Indonesian footballers
Persiraja Banda Aceh players
Association football defenders
People from Lhokseumawe
Sportspeople from Aceh